Christine Zukowski (born August 9, 1989, in Philadelphia, Pennsylvania) is an American former competitive figure skater. She is the 2006 World Junior bronze medalist.

Zukowski started skating at age five. She changed coaches to Priscilla Hill before the 2007 U.S. Championships, where she placed 10th. After missing the 2007–08 season, she announced her retirement in April 2008 due to a chronic back injury.

Programs

Competitive highlights
GP: Grand Prix; JGP: Junior Grand Prix

References

External links

 
 

1989 births
Living people
American female single skaters
Sportspeople from Philadelphia
World Junior Figure Skating Championships medalists
21st-century American women